The siege of Thionville was a battle of the Franco-Prussian War which occurred in Thionville of the Moselle from November 13 to November 24, 1870. The small French garrison repulsed an attempted attack on August 14. It was subjected to a blockade and then besieged from November 13. After the capitulation of Metz, on October 28, 1870, the Prussians move part of their powerful artillery to Thionville. Bombed from November 22, the square surrendered on November 24. The capture of Thionville and that of Montmédy a month later gave the Germans control of the railroad to the Picardy front.

The siege

At the start of the war, the small fortress of Thionville was put under siege in July 1870. It serves as a supply base in the 4th  Army Corps which was under General Paul de Ladmirault. Its garrison, commanded by Colonel Maurice Turnier, consists of a National Guard battalion plus a few cuirassiers and dragoons.

On August 12, a patrol of Prussian cuirassiers makes a reconnaissance near a city gate and finds that it is only weakly defended. She made her report to General Gneisenau who, gathering various information, concluded that the place could be taken by a helping hand. While the 3rd Cavalry Division stands remote observation, the 31st Infantry Brigade, in the night of October 13 to 14, goes to the place with ladders and explosives. Coming out of the Yutz around 3 am, the brigade ran into a French detachment which opened fire; at the same time, a Prussian scout noticed that a flooding of the Moselle made the passage impracticable for fording. The Prussians withdrew without result.

After the defeat at the Battle of Gravelotte on August 18, 1870, the main French army, commanded by Marshal Bazaine, locks itself in Metz where it is besieged by the Prussian army. The Prussians then decide to surround Thionville, defended by regular troops and mobile guards, to prevent it from supporting the Metz garrison. They sent an ultimatum to the Grand Duchy of Luxembourg which was on the border with Thionville and linked to this city by the Ardennes railway, to stop providing aid to the besieged.

The 14th Infantry Division commanded by Georg von Kameke takes position in front of the town on November 13. The place, was lightly fortified, however it was covered by two lines of heights, floods and swamps. On November 22, the besiegers open the bombardment with 85 artillery shelling, accompanied by an infantry attack which gave little results because of the heavy rains. On November 24, the town capitulates and the Germans take 4,000 prisoners as well as 199 cannons and other important supplies.

Aftermath
The French National Guards stationed were allowed to return to their homes . The German troops of Edwin von Manteuffel who surrounded Thionville were immediately assigned to the Siege of Montmédy which in turn surrendered at December 14, giving the Germans control of the railway from Sedan to Thionville.

During the Treaty of Frankfurt (May 10, 1871), Thionville was part of the territories of Alsace-Lorraine ceded to the German Empire. Part of the city's population emigrated to France as they didn't want to become German citizens.

References

1870 in France
Thionville
Thionville
Thionville
Thionville
November 1870 events